{|
|}

The North American A-36 (listed in some sources as "Apache" or "Invader", but generally called Mustang) was the ground-attack/dive bomber version of the North American P-51 Mustang, from which it could be distinguished by the presence of rectangular, slatted dive brakes above and below the wings. A total of 500 A-36 dive bombers served in the Mediterranean and Southeast Asia theaters during World War II before being withdrawn from operational use in 1944.

The A-36 project was a stopgap measure intended to keep North American Aviation (NAA) assembly lines running during the first half of 1942 despite the US having exhausted its funds earmarked for fighter aircraft. When the order came for more P-51s in June 1942, the NAA workforce was thoroughly experienced.

Design and development
With the introduction of the North American Mustang Mk.I with the Royal Air Force's Army Co-operation Squadrons in February 1942, the new fighter began combat missions as a low-altitude reconnaissance and ground-support aircraft. Supplementing the Curtiss P-40 Tomahawks already in service, Mustang Mk Is were first supplied to No. 26 Squadron RAF, then rapidly deployed to 10 additional squadrons by June 1942. First used in combat over the Dieppe Raid on 19 August 1942, a Mustang of No. 414 (RCAF) Squadron downed one of the formidable Focke-Wulf Fw 190s, the first victory for a Mustang. Despite the limited high-altitude performance of the Allison V-1710 engine, the RAF was enthusiastic about its new mount, which "performed magnificently".

During the Mustang Mk. I's successful combat initiation, North American's president Howard "Dutch" Kindelberger pressed the newly redesignated U.S. Army Air Forces (USAAF) for a fighter contract for the essentially similar P-51, 93 of which had passed into the USAAF when the Lend-Lease contract with Britain ran out of funds. The Mustang Mk IA/P-51 used four 20 mm Hispano wing cannon in place of the original armament, a combination of four wing-mounted .  M1919 Browning machine guns and four  M2 Browning machine guns, two of which were mounted in the wings, while the second pair was mounted in the "chin", or lower engine cowling, and synchronized to fire through the propeller. No funds were available for new fighter contracts in fiscal year 1942, but General Oliver P. Echols and Fighter Project Officer Benjamin S. Kelsey wanted to ensure that the P-51 remained in production.

Since appropriations were available for an attack aircraft, Echols specified modifications to the P-51 to turn it into a dive bomber. The contract for 500 A-36A aircraft fitted with bomb racks, dive brakes, and heavier-duty wing, was signed by Kelsey on 16 April 1942, even before the first flight of the first production P-51 in May 1942. With orders on the books, North American Aviation (NAA) began modifying the P-51 to accept the bomb shackles which had already been tested in a "long-range ferry" program that the RAF had stipulated. Engineering studies totaling 40,000 hours and wind tunnel testing with a ⅛-scale model were completed in June 1942. Utilizing the basic P-51 airframe and Allison engine, structural reinforcing "beefed up" several high stress areas and "a set of hydraulically operated dive brakes were installed in each main wing plane". Due to the slightly inboard placement of the bomb racks and unique installation of four cast aluminum dive brakes, a complete redesign of the P-51 wing was required.

The first A-36A (42-83663) was rolled out of the NAA Inglewood plant in September 1942, rapidly going through flight testing with the first flight in October, with deliveries commencing soon after of the first production machines. The A-36A continued the use of nose-mounted  machine guns along with wing armament of four  caliber machine guns. The main air scoop inlet was redesigned to become a fixed unit with a larger opening, replacing the earlier scoop which could be lowered into the airstream. In addition the A-36 carburetor air intake was later fitted with a tropical air filter to stop sand and grit being ingested into the engine.

The USAAF later ordered 310 P-51As, which were essentially A-36s without the dive-brakes and nose-mounted weapons, leaving an armament of four wing-mounted  Browning machine guns. An Allison V-1710-81  was fitted and used the same radiator and air intake as the A-36A. The P-51A was still fitted with bomb racks although it was not intended to be used primarily as a fighter-bomber and the racks were mainly used to carry drop tanks.

Operational history

The A-36A-1-NA "Apache" (although Apache was the A-36A's official name, it was rarely used) joined the 27th Fighter-Bomber Group (27th FBG) composed of four squadrons based at Ras el Ma Airfield in French Morocco in April 1943 during the campaign in North Africa. The 27th had a mixed component of Douglas A-20 Havocs and A-36As while the second operational unit, the 86th Fighter Bomber Group (Dive) arrived in March 1943 with the first pilots trained and qualified on the A-36A. On 6 June 1943, both of these A-36A units flew combat missions directed against the island of Pantelleria. The island fell to Allied attack and became the home base for the two A-36A groups during the Allied invasion of Sicily. Pilots soon recognized that extending the dive brakes after "peel-off" led to some unequal extension of the brakes due to varying hydraulic pressure, setting up an invariable slight roll, which impeded aiming. Proper technique soon cured this anomaly and, subsequently, pilots achieved extremely consistent results.

Dive brakes in the wings gave the A-36A greater stability in a dive; however, a myth has arisen that they were useless due to malfunctions or because of the danger of deploying them and that they should be wired closed. Capt. Charles E. Dills, 522d Fighter Squadron, 27th FBG, XIIth Air Force emphatically stated in a postwar interview: "I flew the A-36 for 39 of my 94 missions, from 11/43 to 3/44. They were never wired shut in Italy in combat. This 'wired shut' story apparently came from the training group at Harding Field, Baton Rouge, LA."

However, tactical reconnaissance training with P-51 and A-36 aircraft had delivered some disquieting accident rates. At one time, A-36 training had resulted in the type having "the highest accident rate per hour's flying time" of any USAAF aircraft. The most serious incident involved an A-36A shedding both wings when its pilot tried to pull out from a  dive. Combat units flying the A-36A were ordered to restrict their approach to a 70° "glide" attack and refrain from using dive brakes. This order was generally ignored by experienced pilots, but some units did wire dive brakes shut until modifications made to the hydraulic actuators. Nevertheless, the A-36 was used with great success as a dive-bomber, acquiring a reputation for precision, sturdiness and silence.

By late May 1943, 300 A-36As had been deployed to the Mediterranean Theater, with many of the first batch sent to the 27th FBG to re-build the group following losses as well as completing the final transition to an all-A-36A unit. Both groups were actively involved in air support during the Sicilian campaign, becoming especially adept at "mopping up" enemy gun positions and other strong points as the Allies advanced. During this operation, the 27th FBG circulated a petition to adopt the name "Invader" for their rugged little bomber, receiving unofficial recognition of the more fitting name. Despite the name change, most combat reports preferred the name "Mustang" for all of the variants. Author William Hess claims that the Germans gave it a flattering, if fearsome, accolade, calling the A-36As: "screaming helldivers."

Besides dive bombing, the A-36A racked up aerial victories, totaling 84 enemy aircraft downed and creating an "ace", Lieutenant Michael T. Russo from the 27th FBG (ultimately, the only ace using the Allison-engined Mustang). As fighting intensified in all theaters where the A-36A operated, the dive bomber began to suffer an alarming loss rate with 177 falling to enemy action. The main reason for the attrition was the hazardous missions that placed the A-36A "on the deck" facing murderous ground fire. German defenses in southern Italy included placing cables across hill tops to snare the attacking A-36As. Despite establishing a reputation for reliability and performance, the one "Achilles' heel" of the A-36A (and the entire Mustang series) remained the ventral-fuselage location of the  radiator/cooling system, leading to many of the losses. By June 1944, A-36As in Europe were replaced by Curtiss P-40s and Republic P-47 Thunderbolts.

A-36As also served with the 311th Fighter Bomber Group in the China-Burma-India theater. The 311th had arrived in Dinjan, India by late summer 1943 after being shipped across the Pacific via Australia. Two squadrons were equipped with the A-36A while the third flew P-51As. Tasked with reconnaissance, dive bombing, attack and fighter missions, the A-36A was outclassed by its main opposition, the Nakajima Ki-43 "Oscar." The light and highly agile Japanese fighter could outmaneuver the A-36A at all altitudes but did have some weak points: it was lightly armed and offered little protection for pilot or fuel tanks. However, the A-36A fought at a significant disadvantage, having to carry out long-range missions often at altitudes above The Hump that meant its Allison engine was below peak performance. In a fighter escort mission over Burma, three A-36As were lost without scoring a single victory. The A-36A CBI missions continued throughout 1943–1944 with indifferent results. The A-36A remained in service in small numbers throughout the remaining year of the war, some being retained in the US as training aircraft.

"The type's relatively brief service life should not camouflage the fact that it made a major contribution to the Allied war effort" especially in the Mediterranean and it amounted to the first USAAF combat use of a Mustang variant. The effectiveness of the A-36 as a ground attack aircraft was demonstrated on 5 June 1944. In a well-planned attack on the large, well defended rail depot and ammunition dump at Orte, Italy, Lieutenant Ross C. Watson led a flight of four A-36s through a heavy overcast on the approach to the target. Watson's A-36s scored several hits under intense anti-aircraft fire although his aircraft was damaged by ground fire. Under continuing heavy ground fire, Watson pressed home his attack and destroyed the ammunition dump before making an emergency landing at an advanced Allied airfield.

Operators

 Royal Air Force
 One A-36A was supplied to the RAF in March 1943 for experimental purposes. Its RAF serial number was EW998.

 US Army Air Force
 27th Fighter-Bomber Group
 86th Fighter-Bomber Group
 311th Fighter Bomber Group

Surviving aircraft

Relatively few A-36As survived the war and the subsequent postwar retirement and scrapping of obsolete types. One A-36A, bearing race number #44, owned and flown by Kendall Everson, was entered in the 1947 Kendall Trophy Race. It was able to reach , finishing second to the winning P-51D flown by Steve Beville.
Airworthy
A-36A
 42-83731 – private owner in Houston, Texas
 42-83738 Baby Carmen – Collings Foundation in Stow, Massachusetts

On display
A-36A
 42-83665 Margie H – National Museum of the United States Air Force at Wright-Patterson AFB in Dayton, Ohio.

Specifications (A-36A)

See also

References

Notes

Citations

Bibliography

 Delve, Ken. The Mustang Story. London: Cassell & Co., 1999. .
 
 Grinsell, Robert. "P-51 Mustang". Great Book of World War II Airplanes. New York: Wing & Anchor Press, 1984. .
 Gunston, Bill and Robert F. Dorr. "North American P-51 Mustang: The Fighter that Won the War." Wings of Fame Vol. 1. London: Aerospace Publishing Ltd., 1995. .
 Gruenhagen, Robert W. Mustang: The Story of the P-51 Mustang. New York: Arco Publishing Company, Inc., 1969. .
 Hess, William N. Fighting Mustang: The Chronicle of the P-51. New York: Doubleday and Company, 1970. .
 Kinnert, Reed. Racing Planes and Air Races: A Complete History, Volume IV: 1946–1967. Fallbrook, California: Aero Publishers, Inc., 1969 (revised ed.) .
 Kinzey, Bert. P-51 Mustang Mk In Detail & Scale: Part 1; Prototype through P-51C. Carrollton, Texas: Detail & Scale Inc., 1996. 
 Mizrahi, Joe. "Pursuit Plane 51." Airpower, Vol. 25, no. 5, September 1995, pp.5–53.
 Smith, Peter C. Straight Down! The North American A-36 Dive Bomber in Action. North Branch, Minnesota: Specialty Press, 2000. 
 Spick, Mike. "The North American P-51 Mustang." Great Aircraft of WWII. Leicester, UK: Abbeydale Press, 1997. .
 Taylor, John W.R. "North American P-51 Mustang." Combat Aircraft of the World from 1909 to the present. New York: G.P. Putnam's Sons, 1969. .
 United States Air Force Museum Guidebook. Dayton, Ohio: Air Force Museum Foundation, Wright-Patterson AFB, 1975.

External links

 North American A-36A Apache
 Mustang!
 WW II History of the 86th Fighter Group

North American A-36
World War II ground attack aircraft of the United States
World War II dive bombers of the United States
A-36
Single-engined tractor aircraft
Low-wing aircraft
North American P-51 Mustang
Aircraft first flown in 1942